Grange Park Preparatory School (GPPS) is an independent school for girls and boys aged three to eleven.

Situated in The Chine in the Grange Park area of Enfield, the school was founded in 1924 and still occupies its original site. The school consists of two buildings on the same site. The current Headteacher is Miss Rizzo.

Structure
The original House is now home to Years 4, 5 and 6, the KS2 library and the computer suite, as well as the school's administrative offices.

The Lower School has the form rooms for the rest of the school, nursery, the school hall, the KS1 library, the science and art facilities, the kitchen and the playgrounds. The school has had a historic past, with a very old Hall.

Grange Park Preparatory School is now part of the inspired Learning Group of schools.

External links
 Official website
 GPPS at the Independent Schools Council

1924 establishments in England
Educational institutions established in 1924
Private co-educational schools in London
Private schools in the London Borough of Enfield
Preparatory schools in London
Enfield, London